Litmanová (Lytmanova; ;  - until 1902 Littmanova) is a village and municipality in Stará Ľubovňa District in the Prešov Region of northern Slovakia. A small ski resort and a Catholic religious site are located in Litmanová.

History
In historical records the village was first mentioned in 1412, when Hungary leased Litmanová to Poland in an effort to raise money for a war.  After 360 years of Polish rule, Poland returned Litmanová to Hungary in 1772.  The village was located in the northeastern part of Szepes County. Then in 1918, the dissolution of the Austro-Hungarian Empire paved the way for Litmanová’s admittance into the newly formed country of Czechoslovakia. Finally, in 1993, through a joint decision, Czechoslovakia was partitioned into two independent countries, Czechia and Slovakia. Since this time, Litmanová has been part of the Slovak Republic. Many residents emigrated to the United States in the early 20th century.

Geography
It had a population of 629 people in 2004, most of them Rusyns. Litmanová is located very close to the Polish border. No roads cross the border here, but there are a number of hiking trails with border crossings.

Government
Litmanová’s government consists of a head mayor and seven councilmen. Elections are held every four years.  Each official is elected by the village people. There are no term limits.

Education
Education in this small village is limited to one tiny schoolhouse. The school holds roughly: 80 pupils, 10 teachers, a principal and a vice-principal. Only grades 1 to 4 are taught here. For further education, pupils must travel to the nearest city, Stará Ľubovňa, approximately 12 km (7 miles) away.

Great religious events

Between 1990 and 1995, two young girls - Ivetka Korčáková (born 1978) and Katka Češelková (born 1977) - reported several apparitions of the Blessed Virgin Mary under the title of The Immaculate Purity on Zvir Mountain in Litmanová. During these religious events, the visionaries were accompanied by many priests, and now there is a Marian shrine at the place of the apparitions. Many people, not only Slovaks, make pilgrimages to this location to celebrate the Divine Liturgy and obtain water from a holy stream.

Notable residents
Maria Gulovich Liu, OSS agent in WWII

References

External links

Litmanová - The Carpathian Connection
https://web.archive.org/web/20070427022352/http://www.statistics.sk/mosmis/eng/run.html
http://nbenyo.ipower.com
http://www.vislocky.net/Litmanova.html
https://web.archive.org/web/20181113003718/http://toodle.info/litmanova-obr/ - photo gallery from Zvir
http://www.litmanova.info/ - information about come of Virgin Mary on Zvir Mountain

Villages and municipalities in Stará Ľubovňa District
Catholic pilgrimage sites